Damano Rio Solomon (born 13 October 1994) is a Jamaican international footballer who plays for Portmore United, as a defender.

Career
Born in Kingston, Solomon has played club football for Sporting Central Academy, Portmore United and UWI FC.

He made his international debut for Jamaica in 2018.

References

1994 births
Living people
Jamaican footballers
Jamaica international footballers
Sporting Central Academy players
Portmore United F.C. players
UWI F.C. players
National Premier League players
Association football defenders